Potrerillos is a corregimiento in Dolega District, Chiriquí Province, Panama. Its population as of 1990 was 1,157; its population as of 2000 was 1,378.

References

Corregimientos of Chiriquí Province

es:Potrerillos (Chiriquí)